The 2010 ITU Sprint Distance Triathlon World Championships was a triathlon race organised by the International Triathlon Union (ITU) held in Lausanne, Switzerland on August 21.  The event hosted both elite-level and amateur triathletes. This marked the inaugural year for the ITU World Triathlon Series sprint distance championship race. The sprint race replaced the ITU Triathlon World Cup event held in Lausanne in previous years. The race was held over a distance of 750 m swim, 20 km cycle, 5 km run. A prize purse of $50,000 was awarded for the sprint event.

Results

Men

Women

References

External links
ITU 2010 Sprint Championships event website
Lausanne event website

World Cup
2010 in Swiss sport
International sports competitions hosted by Switzerland
Triathlon competitions in Switzerland